Politia Live Clubbing summer 2010 is a 2004 series of concerts by Greek pop/rock singer Sakis Rouvas with Greek pop singer Tamta, rock group CABIN 54, and upcoming singers Stefania Rizou and Eleana Azoukia as his supporting acts, with Giorgos Axas as his special series guest. The show was an extension of The S Club concert series and brought the show to Thessaloniki beginning on 14 May.

Background
Following five successful months at Rouvas' self-owned The S Club, Rouvas opted to move the show to Thessaloniki. This is Rouvas third consecutive summer series at Politia; he had first performed there with Peggy Zina in 2008, and continued his own performances in 2009 while also on a national tour, although this performance was not an extension of his Athens STARZ shows. Originally, the premiere date was announced as 7 May. The media speculated that due to further perfecting technical developments of the show it would finally premiere one week later, although the crew themselves did not actually comment on this. This was materialized when the show premiered on 14 May. Originally set for a six-week engagement, Rouvas told ANT1 News that they would also be present in the city in August, bringing the total number of shows to more than 24. The show was similar to The S Club shows, however, some changes were made: the Greek The X Factor contestant Eleftheria Eleftheriou was taken out of the program and rapper Gifted was replaced with Giorgos Axas. The deejay was also changed to Antonis Dimitriadis, who is the house deejay at Politia. Additionally, Rouvas performed in an entirely different wardrobe than his S Club outfits.

Opening acts
Tamta
CABIN 54
Stefania Rizou
Eleana Azouki
Giorgos Axas (special guest)

Setlist
A list of songs performed at the shows.

"Tharros I Alitheia"
"Kita Me"
"S'Opion Aresei" (Dansonra)
"Mia Stigmi Esi Ki Ego"
"Ela Ston Rythmo"
"Crazy in Love" (Beyoncé Knowles)

"Spase To Hrono"
"+ Se Thelo"
"Emena Thes"
"Tha Trelatho"
"Pio Dinata"
"Irthes"
"Den Ehei Sidera I Kardia Sou"
"Mikros Titanikos (Se Latrevo)"
"Ipirhes Panda"
"S'eho Erotefthi"
"Xana"
"Ela Mou"
"Pano Ap'Ola" (Mironas Stratis)
"Billie Jean" (Michael Jackson)
"Thriller" (Michael Jackson)
"Skoni Kai Thripsala"/"Giati" (Stefanos Korkolis)
"Etsi Xafnika" (Antonis Remos)
"Ola S'agapane" (Stamatis Gonidis)

Tour dates
The following is a list of the planned tour dates for the Politia concerts:

Broadcasting and recording
Rouvas' home network, ANT1, reserved the rights to record and broadcast the concert, as they have done for all Rouvas concerts since his STARZ performances.

Reception
The show received mostly positive reviews from critics. ANT1 called it "the most-anticipated show of the year."

Personnel

Musicians
Sakis Rouvas – vocals, guitar, creative director, choreographer
Tamta – vocals
CABIN 54 – vocals, guitar, bass
Stefania Rizou – vocals
Eleana Azouki – vocals
Giorgos Axas – vocals
Antonis Dimitriadis – deejay

Production
Tony Kontaxakis – arranger
Antonis Skokos – arranger
Paris Anagnostopoulos – lighting designer
Sandy Leulier – choreographer

Tour sponsors
Trident Senses
ANT1
ANT1 Radio 97.5 FM
Rhythmos 104
Makedonia TV Channel
Live!
Makedonia – Thessaloniki

Notes

External links

2010 concert tours
Sakis Rouvas concert tours
Concert tours of Europe